Garforth railway station serves the town of Garforth, near Leeds in West Yorkshire, England. It is one of the two stations in Garforth the other being East Garforth which is situated about 0.5 miles (900 metres) east from the main station and which was opened in 1987. It lies on the Selby Line. The station is served by Northern and TransPennine Express services.

History
The station was originally opened by the Leeds and Selby Railway in 1834. The road bridge crosses the line at an oblique angle; this was considered something of a marvel at the time of construction.  The station then linked the town with the former Leeds Marsh Lane railway station.  The current buildings date from 1872 and were designed by NER architect Thomas Prosser.

Garforth station also connected with the privately owned Aberford Railway (known locally as the 'fly line' or simply 'the lines') which closed in 1924, and is now a public path commonly used for horses, dog walkers and travelling to and from Garforth Academy part way upon it. East of the station was the junction to the branch line to  via Ledston which closed to passengers in 1951 and completely in 1969.

Though East Garforth is fully accessible to wheelchair users, the main Garforth station is not; wheelchair users can only access platform 2 which serves trains towards Leeds.

In 2015 additional shelters were placed on both platforms, doubling the sheltered capacity.

Facilities

The station buildings are concentrated on the Leeds bound platform, which is disabled accessible (the opposite platform can only be accessed via a footbridge). There is a ticket office (open 06:00-14:00 Mondays to Saturdays) and waiting room in the buildings; the remaining space is leased out to a taxi company.  The Leeds bound platform also has an automatic ticket machine that can be used out of hours and a vending machine.  As well as the heated waiting room on the Leeds bound platform, there are two shelters available for use out of office hours.  The York bound platform has two passenger shelters.  The two platforms are connected by a footbridge with stepped access, this also links to Aberford Road.  The station has a large car park which is free for passenger use. There is CCTV and lighting throughout the station and car park. Refreshments can purchased from the Station House Café, which opened in August 2016, and is situated on the Leeds bound platform (2).

Services

Northern operates a half-hourly service to Leeds, as well as hourly services to York and  via  to the east. The Hull service began operating at the winter 2019 timetable change and runs through to  via Bradford Interchange in the westbound direction, restoring the link to Bradford lost when the York to Blackpool North service ceased calling in May 2018 (this has been reinstated however in December 2022).
).

TransPennine Express trains also stop at Garforth hourly towards Leeds, Huddersfield and Liverpool Lime Street westbound and  eastbound. The service now also stops here on Sundays since the start of the winter 2019 timetable. However these services have also been reinstated in the December 2022 timetable and now run to Liverpool and Manchester once again.

Proposed services
National Express East Coast proposed to operate trains directly between Garforth and London from December 2009.  This proposal was supported by the Office of the Rail Regulator in January 2009, however the Department of Transport had rejected the plans because the proposal would require changes to franchised services and there was not enough capacity for these services, however Virgin Trains East Coast had plans to increase capacity and introduce a number of direct services between Garforth and London from 2019.  The plans have not as yet (summer 2019) been implemented, as VTEC no longer operates the East Coast franchise and a private successor is yet to be agreed upon.

Other transport links

The station has a taxi-office with the taxi rank directly outside the main buildings.  Buses serve the station on Aberford Road, to which there is a direct link from the stations' footbridge.

References

External links

The LNER Encyclopedia: The Aberford Railway
The LNER Encyclopedia: The Leeds and Selby Railway

Railway stations in Leeds
DfT Category E stations
Former Leeds and Selby Railway stations
Railway stations in Great Britain opened in 1834
Railway stations in Great Britain closed in 1840
Railway stations in Great Britain opened in 1850
Railway stations served by TransPennine Express
Northern franchise railway stations
Garforth